Undozero is a rural locality (a settlement) and the administrative center of Undozerskoye Rural Settlement of Plesetsky District, Arkhangelsk Oblast, Russia. The population was 836 as of 2010. There are 5 streets.

Geography 
Undozero is located 98 km west of Plesetsk (the district's administrative centre) by road.

References 

Rural localities in Plesetsky District